Monaragala is a district in Uva Province of Sri Lanka.

Main Towns

 Monaragala
 Bibile
 Buttala
 Wellawaya
 Kataragama
 Siyambalanduva
 medagama
 Thanamalvila
 Badalkubura
 Sevanagala
 madulla

Other towns
 Siyambalanduwa
 Ethimale
 Medagama
 Thanamalwila
 Badalkumbura
 Madulla
 Okkampitiya

Statistics

Religion

Buddhism is the predominant religion in Moneragala.

Ethnicity

In 2008 - Source

Natural parks
 Gal Oya National Park
 Yala National Park
 Udawalawe National park

Major reservoirs
 Senanayake Reservoir
 Muthukandiya Reservoir
 Weheragala Reservoir
 Handapanagala Reservoir
 Udawalawa Reservoir
 Alikota ara Reservoir

Rivers
 Menik Ganga
 Hulanda oya
 Gal oya
 Heda oya
 Wila oya
 Kumbukkan Oya
 Kirindi oya
 ranwanna oya

Tourist attractions
 Katharagama
 Maligawila
 Buduruwagala
 Goviduhela rock
 Yala National Park
 Galoya National Park
 Udawalawa National Park
 Ellewela Waterfall

See also
History of Uva Province

References

External links
 Office of the Governor - Uva / ඌව පලාත් ආණ්ඩුකාරවර කාර්යාලය  

 
Districts of Sri Lanka